Santa Susana may refer to Saint Susanna, martyred in 295.

Santa Susana or Santa Susanna may also refer to several places:
Santa Susana, California, a census-designated place in Ventura County
Santa Susana Mountains in southern California.
Santa Susana Mountains, a mountain range northwest of Los Angeles
Santa Susana Pass, running through the Santa Susana Mountains
Santa Susana Field Laboratory, near Los Angeles, a test facility for rockets and (formerly) nuclear reactors
Santa Susanna, Rome, a church on the Quirinal in Rome
Santa Susanna, Catalonia, a small town on the Costa del Maresme of Spain